The marasca is a type of cherry native to Croatia. It may also refer to:
Mărasca River
Măreasca River, also known as the Măraşca River